The Ewen Maddock Dam is an earth-fill embankment dam with an un-gated spillway across the Addlington Creek that is located in Landsborough in the South East region of  Queensland, Australia. The main purpose of the dam is for potable water supply of the Sunshine Coast region.

Location and features
The dam is built across the Addlington Creek, a tributary of the Mooloolah River, and was commenced in 1973, completed in 1976, with a subsequent upgrade to the height of the spillway in 1982.

The dam is managed by Seqwater.

Water supply
In the past, raw water from the dam has been supplied to a treatment plant at Caloundra. Since 1988 Ewen Maddock Dam was not used as a water source due to a lack of working water treatment infrastructure. In 2007, work began on an 30 million water treatment plant that will allow the dam to supply drinking water to the South East Queensland Water Grid, via the Northern Pipeline inter-connector. The Queensland Government incorporated a  timber boardwalk along the reservoir's edge into the revised master plan when open space at Ewen Maddock Park was resumed for the treatment plant's construction.

Recreation
Swimming is permitted in the reservoir. Boating is limited to paddle power, due to the likelihood that powered boats would agitate the water and cause noxious weeds to break apart and spread.

Access is limited to daylight hours and no camping is permitted, except at a group camping site with cabins and dormitories, called the Ewen Maddock Dam Recreation Centre which is located at the south eastern end of the lake.

Fauna and Flora
Ewen Maddock Dam is stocked with bass, silver perch, golden perch and southern saratoga, while bony bream is also present naturally. As Of September 1, 2016 the lake is on the "Stocked impoundments" register and requires a "SIPS" permit for fishing.  The lake is weedy and shallow, except in the northern parts close to the dam wall. The weed species, Cabomba and Salvinia, have been the target of weed eradication programs by CalAqua. The dam is a good place to see jabirus. South-eastern banks of the lake are heavily forested and protected within the Beerwah State Forest.

See also

List of dams in Queensland

References

External links

Sunshine Coast, Queensland
Dams completed in 1973
Dams in Queensland
Earth-filled dams
1973 establishments in Australia
Embankment dams